Joseph Warwick Bigger (11 September 1891 – 17 August 1951) was an Irish politician and academic. He was an independent member of Seanad Éireann from 1947 to 1951.

Bigger was born on 11 September 1891 in Belfast, Ireland to Sir Edward Coey Bigger who was a Senator from 1925 to 1936 and to Maude Coulter Warwick. In 1900, his family shifted to Dublin due to appointment of his father as medical inspector under the Local Government Board of Ireland. He attended Presbyterian College in North Carolina and later, Trinity College Dublin. Soon after his graduation from the Trinity College, he was appointed as a demonstrator in pathology and bacteriology at Sheffield University in South Yorkshire, England. However, in 1919 he returned to Dublin and became pathologist and medical inspector under the Local Government Board and the professor of forensic and preventive medicine at the Royal College of Surgeons in 1920. He served as the professor of preventive medicine and bacteriology at Trinity College from 1924 to 1950. In 1936, Bigger was appointed dean of the medical school at Trinity College where he served until 1939. In 1950 he was elected an honorary fellow of Trinity College Dublin. 

He was first elected to the Seanad at a by-election on 22 November 1947 by the Dublin University constituency. The vacancy was caused by the appointment of T. C. Kingsmill Moore as a judge of the High Court. He was re-elected at the 1948 election. He did not contest the 1951 election.

He married Patricia Mai Curtin in 1916 and they had one son and one daughter. Bigger died on 17 August 1951.

Bibliography
1935 - Handbook of bacteriology for students and practitioners of medicine
1941 - Man Against Microbe

References

1891 births
1951 deaths
Academics of Trinity College Dublin
Alumni of Trinity College Dublin
Honorary Fellows of Trinity College Dublin
Independent members of Seanad Éireann
Members of the 5th Seanad
Members of the 6th Seanad
Royal College of Surgeons in Ireland
Members of Seanad Éireann for Dublin University